Eco Company is a weekly children's television show about the environment that debuted in 2009. The show is hosted by a group of teens that focuses on the environment, including ecology, natural resources, and sustainability. As of 2010, Eco Company has two nominations.

The primary format for the show is showcasing teens who make a difference by being green and taking steps to protect the environment in their school or community. Some of the stories that individual teens share are also included in the show.

References

External links

Nature educational television series
Environmental television
2009 American television series debuts
First-run syndicated television programs in the United States